Iván Leonardo Cruz Navarro (born 24 May 1999) is a Peruvian footballer who plays as a left-back for Santos de Nasca.

Club career

Alianza Lima
Cruz is a product of Alianza Lima and was promoted to the club's first team in the Peruvian Primera División for the 2018 season. However, he continued to play for the club's reserve team. In January 2019, he was loaned out to Ayacucho FC, where he made a total of seven appearances in the Peruvian Primera División.

Cruz returned to Alianza for the 2020 season and continued on the reserve team. In the summer 2020, he moved to Santos de Nasca. He left the club at the end of the year.

In May 2021, Cruz joined Comerciantes Unidos. In January 2022, he returned to Santos de Nasca.

International career
In March 2017, Cruz was called up for the Peruvian U18 national team.

References

External links
 
 

Living people
1999 births
Association football defenders
Peruvian footballers
Peruvian Primera División players
Peruvian Segunda División players
Club Alianza Lima footballers
Ayacucho FC footballers
Santos de Nasca players
Comerciantes Unidos footballers